The list of EuroCup-winning head coaches shows all of the head coaches that have won the EuroCup championship. The EuroCup is the European-wide 2nd-tier level men's professional basketball club competition. The competition was founded under the name the ULEB Cup.

Key

List

Multiple winners

See also 
 EuroCup Basketball Coach of the Year
 List of EuroLeague-winning head coaches

References

Coaches